The Jakarta XML Web Services (JAX-WS; formerly Java API for XML Web Services) is a Jakarta EE API for creating web services, particularly SOAP services. JAX-WS is one of the Java XML programming APIs.

Overview
The JAX-WS 2.2 specification JSR 224 defines a standard Java- to-WSDL mapping which determines how WSDL operations are bound to Java methods when a SOAP message invokes a WSDL operation. This Java-to-WSDL mapping determines which Java method gets invoked and how that SOAP message is mapped to the method’s parameters.

This mapping also determines how the method’s return value gets mapped to the SOAP response.

JAX-WS uses annotations, introduced in Java SE 5, to simplify the development and deployment of web service clients and endpoints. It is part of the Java Web Services Development Pack. JAX-WS can be used in Java SE starting with version 6. JAX-WS 2.0 replaced the JAX-RPC API in Java Platform, Enterprise Edition 5 which leans more towards document style Web Services.

This API provides the core of Eclipse Metro.

JAX-WS also is one of the foundations of WSIT.

Standards Supported
 JAX-WS 2.0/2.1/2.2 (JSR 224)
 WS-I Basic Profile 1.2 and 2.0
 WS-I Attachments Profile 1.0
 WS-I Simple SOAP Binding Profile 1.0
 WS-Addressing 1.0 - Core, SOAP Binding, WSDL Binding

Main JWS Packages

XML Web Services related Specs

Implementations
Eclipse Metro in Eclipse Enterprise for Java (EE4J)
Apache CXF
Apache Axis2
JBossWS in WildFly
IBM WebSphere Jax-Ws in WebSphere
Oracle Weblogic

References

External links

java.net project pages
JAX-WS java.net project page
GlassFish java.net project page
Documentation
JAX-WS Javadoc
JAX-WS in the Java EE 5 Tutorial
Tutorials
JAX-WS Tutorials

Java enterprise platform
Java API for XML
Web service specifications